Indian Congress (Socialist) – Sarat Chandra Sinha (ICS(SCS)) was a political party in India between 1984 and 1999. The party was formed through a split in the Indian Congress (Socialist), and was led by former Assam Chief Minister (1971–78), Sarat Chandra Sinha.

This faction merged with Sharad Pawar's Nationalist Congress Party (NCP) in 1999.

See also
Indian National Congress breakaway parties

References

1984 establishments in India
Defunct political parties in Assam
Defunct socialist parties in India
Indian National Congress breakaway groups
Nationalist Congress Party
Political parties established in 1984